Iñaxi Etxabe (26 March 1933 – 11 July 2020) was a Spanish bertsolari singer.

Etxabe was born in Oikia, Zumaia in 1933 and first acted as a bertsolari in a public role in 1956. A major focus of their music was on defending women.

Etxabe died on 11 July 2020, aged 87.

References

Bertsolaris
Basque singers
1933 births
2020 deaths
People from Urola Kosta
Place of death missing
20th-century Spanish women singers
20th-century Spanish singers